Berberis sikkimensis is a plant species native to the high Himalayas at elevations of 2000–3000 m. It is known from Sikkim, Nepal, Bhutan, Tibet and Yunnan.

Berberis sikkimensis is a shrub up to 250 cm tall, with pale yellow spines up to 20 mm long on the younger twigs. Leaves are egg-shaped, up to 25 mm long, leathery, heavily whitened with a waxy layer below. Inflorescence is a panicle or raceme of up to 20 flowers. Berries are dark red, narrowly egg-shaped, up to 15 mm long.

References

sikkimensis
Flora of temperate Asia
Flora of China
Plants described in 1905